Council Regulation (EEC) No 2658/87 of 23 July 1987, creates the goods nomenclature called the Combined Nomenclature, or in abbreviated form 'CN', established to meet, at one and the same time, the requirements both of the Common Customs Tariff and of the external trade statistics of the European Union.

The codes and the descriptions of goods established on the basis of the combined nomenclature shall replace those established on the basis of the nomenclatures of the Common Customs Tariff and the Nimexe.

It is established on the basis of the Harmonized System. The combined nomenclature shall comprise : (a) the harmonized system nomenclature; (b) Community subdivisions to that nomenclature, referred to as 'CN subheadings' in those cases where a corresponding rate of duty is specified; (c) preliminary provisions, additional section or chapter notes and footnotes relating to CN subheadings.

Each CN subheading shall have an eight digit code number : (a) the first six digits shall be the code numbers relating to the headings and subheadings of the harmonized system nomenclature; (b) the seventh and eighth digits shall identify the CN subheadings.

The commission established an integrated tariff, of the European Communities, referred to as the 'TARIC code', based on the combined nomenclature.

The combined nomenclature, together with the rates of duty and other relevant charges, and the tariff measures included in the Taric or in other Community arrangements shall constitute the common customs tariff referred to in Article 9 of the Treaty, which shall be applied on the importation of goods into the Community

Member States may insert subdivisions after the CN subheadings for national statistical purposes, and after the Taric subheadings for other national purposes.

The Commission shall be assisted by a Committee on Tariff and Statistical Nomenclature, called the 'Nomenclature Committee'.

'Favourable tariff arrangement' means any reduction or suspension, even under a tariff quota, of a customs duty or charge having equivalent effect or of an agricultural levy or other import charge provided for under the common agricultural policy or under the specific  arrangements applicable to certain goods resulting form the processing of agricultural products.

Commission shall adopt each year by means of a Regulation a complete version of the combined nomenclature together with the corresponding autonomous and conventional rates of duty of the Common Customs Tariff, as it results from measures adopted by the council or by the commission. said Regulation shall be published not later than 31 October in the Official Journal of the European Communities and it shall apply from 1 January of the following year.

External links 
 Council Regulation (EEC) No 2658/87.
 Combined nomenclature.
 Trade Finance
 Combined Nomenclature multilingual full-text search engine.
 Eurostat Combined Nomenclature Search Engine

Economic taxonomy
Economy of the European Union
International trade
European Union law